Ayaa Benjamin Warille is a South Sudanese politician who is also the Minister of Gender, Child and Social Welfare. She was appointed into the position when the Transitional Government of National Unity was formed in February 2021

Advocacy 
Ayaa is also a women's rights advocate and has played several roles through the African Union Women, Gender and Youth Directorate to assist AU member states in the ratification, domestication and implementation of the Protocol to the African Charter on Human and Peoples' Rights on the Rights of Women in Africa also popularly known as the Maputo Protocol.

Ayaa Benjamin is a member of the South Sudan Women Intellectual Forum, a platform which has been campaigning for the participation and inclusion of women in government positions and decision making processes in all sectors.

She has also ensured that the 35% affirmative action as guaranteed by the Revitalized Peace Agreement on the Resolution of Conflict in South Sudan, is respected.

References 

21st-century South Sudanese women politicians
21st-century South Sudanese politicians
Living people
Year of birth missing (living people)